Fatmawati Salapuddin is a Filipino politician and director of the Sulu-based Lupah Sug Bangsamoro Women's Association.

References

Lakas–CMD politicians
Politicians from Sulu
Living people
Year of birth missing (living people)
Place of birth missing (living people)
Filipino Muslims